Werner Meier (born 31 May 1949) is a Swiss middle-distance runner. He competed in the men's 1500 metres at the 1972 Summer Olympics.

References

1949 births
Living people
Athletes (track and field) at the 1972 Summer Olympics
Swiss male middle-distance runners
Olympic athletes of Switzerland
Place of birth missing (living people)